Mecyclothorax inflatus is a species of ground beetle in the subfamily Psydrinae. It was described by Baehr in 2003.

References

inflatus
Beetles described in 2003